The Lapwing-class minesweeper, often called the Bird class, was an early "AM-type" oceangoing minesweeper of the United States Navy. Seven ships of the class were commissioned during World War I, and served well into the 1950s. A number were refitted to serve as ocean-going tugs, salvage vessels, seaplane tenders, or submarine rescue ships.

The propulsion system consisted of 2 Babcock & Wilcox 200psi boilers and a 1,400shp Harlan and Hollingsworth triple expansion reciprocating steam engine.

Ships

The table makes no distinction between classification as "Minesweeper No. X" and "AM-X". This change affected all boats equally ca. 1920.

All boats reclassified as Fleet Tugs (AT) where later again reclassified as Fleet Tug, Old (ATO) (ca. 1944). The table treats them the same. Brant and Grebe were never reclassified as ATO.

References

External links
 
 USN Ships
 Ships of the U.S. Navy, 1940–1945

Mine warfare vessel classes